Louis Bezzina (born 19 September 1951) is a former Maltese cyclist. He competed in the team time trial at the 1972 Summer Olympics.

References

External links
 

1951 births
Living people
Maltese male cyclists
Olympic cyclists of Malta
Cyclists at the 1972 Summer Olympics
Place of birth missing (living people)